Devla/Del/Devel, Devlam, Devles, Devleske or Dovel is the word used when directly calling or praying to God in the Romani language.

Names
Devla basically means "God". It cannot be confused with the English word Devil, because the word for "Devil" in Romani is Beng. Interestingly some villages in India are named "Devla", as example Devla, India.

These Roma words existed in the Roma language centuries before any Roma adopted Christianity or Islam. That is, "Devla or Del" is a common noun meaning "a god". It is based on the Sanskrit word deva, related to the Latin words deus ("god") and divinus ("godly, godlike"), Greek Zeus, Lithuanian Dievas and the name for the sky god *Dyeus present throughout Indo-European religions and cultures.

Devlaism
After the Yugoslav Wars, some Roma of different groups, like the Arlije and Gurbeti, created their own Ethnic religion, based on there Folk beliefs of their old Romani mythology, but there are few believers, their holy days are named Djisatedimi. They are named Gadjikane Roma. Rites like infant baptism (Bona) and religious male circumcision (Sunet Bijav) maintained from Christianity and Islam and is performed.

See also
Romani mythology
Kakava

References

Romani religion
Indo-European deities